Samuel Bright was a Scottish professional footballer who played as a defender.

Career
Born in Kilmarnock, Bright played for Sheffield United and Bradford City. For Bradford City, he made 6 appearances in the Football League.

Sources

References

Year of birth missing
Year of death missing
Scottish footballers
Sheffield United F.C. players
Bradford City A.F.C. players
English Football League players
Association football defenders